José Eudes Campos do Nascimento (born in Barbacena, state of Minas Gerais on April 30, 1966) is the bishop of the Roman Catholic Diocese of São João del Rei.
He was appointed in 2019.

References

Brazilian bishops
Catholic bishops in Brazil
1966 births
Living people
People from Barbacena
21st-century Brazilian Roman Catholic priests